Thomas William Burden, 1st Baron Burden (29 January 1885 – 27 May 1970), was a British Labour Party politician and church official.

Burden was the son of Thomas Burden, mayor of East Ham.  He was born in Mile End, and was educated at the London School of Economics.  In 1909, he became the chair of the Poplar Labour League, then became its chair, serving until 1922.  He joined the Railway Clerks' Association, and from 1916 served on its executive committee.  From 1921, he was on the executive of the London Labour Party, and also of the Workers' Educational Association.  He was also active in the Fabian Society and the Independent Labour Party.

In 1942, Burden was elected to the House of Commons as the Member of Parliament (MP) for Sheffield Park, a seat he held until 1950. He was also Second Church Estates Commissioner from 1945 to 1950 and a Member of the House of Laity of the Church Assembly from 1947 to 1950. On 1 February 1950 he was raised to the peerage as Baron Burden, of Hazlebarrow in the County of Derby. From 1950 to 1951 he served as a Lord-in-waiting in the Labour Government of Clement Attlee.

Lord Burden married Augusta, daughter of David Sime, in 1910. He died in May 1970, aged 85, and was succeeded in the barony by his son Philip. Lady Burden died in 1976.

Notes

References
Kidd, Charles, Williamson, David (editors). Debrett's Peerage and Baronetage (1990 edition). New York: St Martin's Press, 1990,

External links 

1885 births
1970 deaths
Alumni of the London School of Economics
Labour Party (UK) Baronesses- and Lords-in-Waiting
Members of the Parliament of the United Kingdom for English constituencies
UK MPs 1935–1945
UK MPs 1945–1950
UK MPs who were granted peerages
Mayors of places in Greater London
Labour Party (UK) hereditary peers
Church Estates Commissioners
Ministers in the Attlee governments, 1945–1951
Barons created by George VI